Abdessamed Bounoua (born 24 April 1991 in Sidi Bel Abbès) is an Algerian footballer who plays as a midfielder for Al-Sadd.

Honours

Club
USM Bel Abbès
 Algerian Cup: 2018

References

External links

1991 births
People from Sidi Bel Abbès
Living people
Association football midfielders
Algerian footballers
Algerian expatriate footballers
USM Bel Abbès players
JS Kabylie players
MC Oran players
Al-Sadd FC (Saudi football club) players
Algerian Ligue Professionnelle 1 players
Algerian Ligue 2 players
Saudi Second Division players
Expatriate footballers in Saudi Arabia
Algerian expatriate sportspeople in Saudi Arabia
21st-century Algerian people